Akalpur is a village in Phillaur tehsil of Jalandhar District of Punjab State, India. It is 2 km from Phillaur, 45.8 km from Jalandhar, and 112 km from state capital at Chandigarh. The nearest train station is situated in Phillaur, nearest domestic airport is 33 km away in Ludhiana and the nearest international airport is 140 km away in Amritsar. The village is administered by the Sarpanch who is an elected representative of village. It(what?) has its postal head office 2 km away in Phillaur.

References 

Villages in Jalandhar district
Villages in Phillaur tehsil